Events from the year 1684 in England.

Incumbents
 Monarch – Charles II

Events
January–March – England has its coldest winter in living memory; the River Thames and the sea as far as 2 miles out from land freezes over. The Chipperfield's Circus dynasty begins when James Chipperfield introduces performing animals to England at the Frost Fair on the Thames in London.
5 January – Charles II gives the title Duke of St Albans to Charles Beauclerk, his illegitimate son by Nell Gwyn.
15 March – highwayman John Nevison hanged in York for murder.
10 May – Titus Oates arrested for perjury.
31 July – the village of Churchill, Oxfordshire, is largely destroyed by fire.
10 December – Isaac Newton's derivation of Kepler's laws from his theory of gravity, contained in the paper De motu corporum in gyrum, is read to the Royal Society by Edmund Halley.

Undated
The East India Company receives Chinese permission to build a trading station at Canton.
Robert Hooke invents the semaphore line.
John Bunyan writes the second part of The Pilgrim's Progress

Births
4 January
Henry Coote, 5th Earl of Mountrath, politician (died 1720)
Henry Grove, nonconformist minister (died 1738)
19 February – George Duckett, Member of Parliament (died 1732)
21 March – Oley Douglas, Member of Parliament (died 1719)
22 March – William Pulteney, 1st Earl of Bath, noble (died 1764)
2 April – Henry Somerset, 2nd Duke of Beaufort, noble (died 1714)
6 June – Nathaniel Lardner, theologian (died 1768)
24 August – Sir Robert Munro, 6th Baronet, politician (died 1746)
17 September – Henry Cantrell, Anglican clergyman, writer (died 1773)
2 October – Thomas Seaton, religious writer (died 1741)
16 October – Peter Walkden, Presbyterian minister and diarist (died 1769)
11 November – Algernon Seymour, 7th Duke of Somerset, noble (died 1750)
12 November – Edward Vernon, admiral (died 1757)
16 November – Allen Bathurst, 1st Earl Bathurst, politician (died 1775)
15 December – James Jurin, scientist and physician (died 1750)
16 December – Samuel Clark of St Albans, theologian (died 1750)
31 December – William Grimston, 1st Viscount Grimston, landowner and Member of Parliament (died 1756)

Deaths
13 January – Henry Howard, 6th Duke of Norfolk, noble (born 1628)
5 February – Dorothy Spencer, Countess of Sunderland (born 1617)
11 February – Sir Thomas Peyton, 2nd Baronet, politician (born 1613)
24 March – Elizabeth Ridgeway, poisoner (burned at the stake)
28 March (bur.) – John Lambert, Parliamentarian general (born 1619)
1 April – Roger Williams, theologian and colonist (born 1603)
5 April – Lord William Brouncker, mathematician (born 1602)
30 April – James Holloway, merchant and conspirator (hanged)
4 May – John Nevison, highwayman (born 1639; hanged)
10 May – Anne Carr, Countess of Bedford, noble (born 1615)
20 June – Sir Thomas Armstrong, politician (born c. 1633; hanged)
6 July – Peter Gunning, royalist churchman (born 1614)
28 July – Charlotte Paston, Countess of Yarmouth, noblewoman, illegitimate daughter of Charles II (born c. 1650)
8 August – George Booth, 1st Baron Delamer (born 1622)
October – Dud Dudley, ironmaster (born 1600?)
12 October – William Croone, physician, an original Fellow of the Royal Society (born 1633)
23 November – William Cavendish, 3rd Earl of Devonshire, noble (born 1617)
10 December – Sir Thomas Sclater, 1st Baronet, politician (born 1615)
22 December – Francis Hawley, 1st Baron Hawley, politician (born 1608)

References

 
Years of the 17th century in England